Jacques Bonsergent was a French engineer who was executed by firing squad on 23 December 1940. Bonsergent's execution has been described as the first execution of a French civilian in the German occupation of France in World War II.

He was trained at the Arts et Métiers ParisTech engineering school and was part of the Gadzarts alumni community.

On 10 November 1940, a jostle on the Rue de Havre in Paris broke out between some Parisians and German soldiers, which ended with a man raising his fist to a German sergeant, and which led to a man named Jacques Bonsergent, who seems only to have been a witness to the quarrel, being arrested in unclear circumstances.

On 5 December 1940, Bonsergent was convicted by a German military court of insulting the Wehrmacht. He insisted on taking full responsibility, saying he wanted to show the French what sort of people the Germans were, and he was shot on 23 December 1940.

The execution of Bonsergent, a man guilty only of being a witness to an incident that was in itself only very trivial, brought home to many of the French the precise nature of the "New Order in Europe". All over Paris, posters warning that all who challenged the might of the Reich would be shot like Bonsergent were torn down or vandalized, despite the warnings from General Otto von Stülpnagel that damaging the posters was an act of sabotage that would be punished by the death penalty; so many posters were torn down and/or vandalized that Stülpnagal had to post policemen to guard them. The writer Jean Bruller remembered being "transfixed" by reading about Bonsergent's fate and how "people stopped, read, wordlessly exchanged glances. Some of them bared their heads as if in the presence of the dead". On Christmas Day 1940, Parisians woke to find that in the previous night, the posters announcing Bonsergent's execution had been turned into shrines, being in Bruller's words "surrounded by flowers, like on so many tombs. Little flowers of every kind, mounted on pins, had been struck on the posters during the night-real flowers and artificial ones, paper pansies, celluloid roses, small French and British flags". The writer Simone de Beauvoir stated that it was not just Bonsergent that people mourned, but also the end of the illusion "as for the first time these correct people who occupied our country were officially telling us they had executed a Frenchman guilty of not bowing his head to them".

A station of the Paris Métro (Station Jacques Bonsergent) and a city place were named after him to honour his memory.

References

20th-century French engineers
1940 deaths
Arts et Métiers ParisTech alumni
People executed by Nazi Germany by firing squad
French people executed by Nazi Germany